Florida Power & Light Company (FPL), the principal subsidiary of NextEra Energy Inc. (formerly FPL Group, Inc.), is the largest power utility in Florida. It is a Juno Beach, Florida-based power utility company serving roughly 5 million customers and 11 million people in Florida. It is a rate-regulated electric utility that generates, transmits, distributes and sells electric energy. In 2020, the company was ranked as the nation's most reliable electric power utility for the fifth time in six years.

In January 2021 Gulf Power Company was merged into FPL, extending the combined service territory into northwest Florida. Gulf Power operated as a separate division within FPL through 2021.

History 

American Power & Light, a utility holding company, purchased electricity firms around Florida from March 1924 until December 1925 and tied them together as Florida Power & Light (FPL). The company was incorporated in December 1925. In January 1926, FPL replaced the Miami Beach Electric company. A 1926 hurricane caused damage to power lines through Miami, and FPL, through its parent company, repaired the damage and built two new generating plants. By spring 1927, FPL had 115,000 customers. In 1950, American Power & Light made FPL an independent public corporation that was listed on the New York Stock Exchange in response to a Congressional act which limited utility holding companies. In 1984, the holding company FPL Group Inc. was formed.

FPL was the first non-Japanese company to win the Deming Prize for quality from the Union of Japanese Scientists and Engineers in 1989. In 1990, FPL and the Jacksonville Electric Authority jointly purchased a portion of Georgia Power Company's Scherer power plant near Macon, Georgia.

After the 2005 storm season which included hurricanes Katrina, Rita, and Wilma, FPL invested more than $2 billion in improvements to the electric grid against severe weather. The company strengthened poles and wires that served critical facilities in the service area.Beginning in 2009, FPL started installing smart meters throughout its service area. The meters transmit energy readings through radio frequencies to the company. The system has alerts for power outages which helps restore power faster. Customers can access a detailed bill which shows how they use power.

In March 2010, FPL Group Inc. changed its name to NextEra Energy Inc. to "modernize" the company's image. The stock ticker changed from FPL to NEE.

In March 2015, FPL launched a Power Delivery Diagnostic Center which uses smart grid technology to manage the electric system in order to maintain reliable service.

In January 2021 Gulf Power Company was legally merged into FPL, extending FPL's service territory into Northwest Florida. Gulf Power will operate as a separate division within FPL through 2021. The two companies will be regulated as separate entities until the Florida Public Service Commission approves the consolidation of their tariffs. In consequence, FPL would also assume Gulf Power's share of the Scherer plant, as well as its share of the Daniel Generating Plant in Jackson County, Mississippi, which Gulf Power co-owned with its former sister company, Mississippi Power.

 Power generation 

Natural gas is the main fuel used by Florida Power and Light Company (FPL) to generate energy, and accounts for 78 percent of the company's energy capacity mix. In 2020, eight percent of capacity was sourced from renewables, namely solar energy.  FPL is the principal subsidiary of NextEra Energy. NextEra Energy and its other subsidiaries, particularly NextEra Energy Resources, have significantly different generation profiles.

FPL Cape Canaveral Next Generation Energy Center
An 800 MW dual fuel facility was built near Cape Canaveral in 1965 to supply power to the new Kennedy Space Center. The original FPL Cape Canaveral power plant was demolished on August 22, 2010, to make way for the FPL Cape Canaveral Next Generation Energy Center. The FPL Cape Canaveral Next Generation Energy Center in Sharpes, Florida was completed and opened in April 2013. The 1,200 MW combined-cycle natural gas-fired facility was 33 percent more efficient than the plant it replaced and produced half the carbon dioxide emissions, 90 percent less pollutants, and had a 50 percent greater capacity. The plant cost $900 million to complete, which was about $140 million under the projected budget.

FPL Port Everglades Next Generation Clean Energy Center
The FPL Port Everglades power plant, which began operation in 1960, was demolished on July 16, 2013, to make way for a new combined cycle facility. The FPL Port Everglades Next Generation Clean Energy Center started construction in 2014 and opened in 2016 as a 1,250 MW facility.

FPL Riviera Beach Next Generation Clean Energy Center
The FPL Riviera Beach power plant, commissioned in 1946, was demolished on June 19, 2011. Construction began in the first quarter of 2012 on the 1,250 MW Next Generation Energy Center by Zachry Holdings. The new plant has three 265 MW combustion engines and one 500 MW steam generator and began service in April 2014.

FPL West County Energy Center
The West County Energy Center began operating in 2009. Before it was built, activists claimed the power plant was a threat to the nearby wildlife refuge and the ecosystem of the Everglades. FPL responded stating that the plant reuses water up to six times in the plant. More than a dozen governmental agencies signed off on the plant which was approved by the governor and cabinet.

FPL Martin Next Generation Solar Energy Center
Martin Next Generation Solar Energy Center is the first hybrid solar facility combining a solar thermal array with a combined cycle natural gas power plant in the world. The 74.5 MW plant began operation in December 2010. The plant has 190,000 mirrors spread over 500 acres.

FPL DeSoto Next Generation Solar Energy Center
The 25 MW DeSoto Next Generation Solar Energy Center was completed in October 2009. The plant has more than 90,000 photovoltaic panels over 235 acres. DeSoto was the largest solar plant in the country in 2010.

Nuclear facilities
In 1965, FPL announced the building of a $100 million nuclear power plant at Turkey Point. The company announced in 2015 that it had started construction on an expansion to the Turkey Point nuclear facility. The expansion of Turkey Point Nuclear facility received criticism from some South Florida mayors over concerns about high water usage, insufficient evacuation zones and increased risks from rising sea levels. FPL responded that they were working to find a solution.

FPL has two nuclear power plants including the St. Lucie Nuclear Power Plant in St. Lucie, Florida (Hutchinson Island) and Turkey Point Nuclear Generating Station. Combined, these two plants produce more than 3,000 megawatts of power.

Other plants
Two power plants were completed in Martin County in 1994.

In January 2015, FPL announced it would build three solar plants in order to triple its solar capacity as well as a natural-gas fired plant in Okeechobee County. The photovoltaic plants will produce approximately 74.5 MW each. The FPL Citrus Solar Energy Center will be located in DeSoto County, FPL Babcock Ranch Solar Energy Center will be in Charlotte County, and FPL Manatee Solar Energy Center in Manatee County will be on the site of an existing fuel-efficient natural gas power plant that FPL operates. FPL plans grid energy storage with 409 MW of power and 900 MWh of energy at the site.

By 2018, 8 additional PV solar sites were in service at 75 MW each.

Pipelines
FPL issued a request-for-proposals (RFP) in December 2012 for new natural gas transportation infrastructure into and within Florida. FPL awarded the projects to two firms: Sabal Trail Transmission, LLC and Florida Southeast Connection, LLC.  FPL will purchase approximately 400 million cubic feet per day beginning in 2017, and will increase to about 600 million cubic feet per day in 2020.

It will terminate at a new Central Florida Hub south of Orlando, Florida, where it will interconnect with the two existing natural gas pipelines that currently serve central and southern Florida. The Sabal Trail pipeline will be capable of transporting more than 1 billion cubic feet per day of natural gas to serve local distribution companies, industrial users and natural gas-fired power generators in the Southeast U.S.

Florida Southeast Connection, LLC is a wholly owned subsidiary of NextEra Energy. To connect with FPL's operations, Florida Southeast Connection will construct a separate,  pipeline from Sabal Trail's Central Florida Hub to FPL's Martin Clean Energy Center in Indiantown, Florida.

Environmental impact

Wildlife
Surrounding the FPL operated Turkey Point Nuclear Power Plant is 168 miles of cooling water canals that attract American crocodiles, which nest in the canals. These canals are home to endangered loggerhead sea turtles, manatees, and crocodiles that are tracked by the plants monitoring program. The sea turtle protection program has tagged over 12,000 sea turtles in 25 years. This program is one of the largest databases of wild captured sea turtles in the world. The College of Turtle Knowledge teaches the public about the study of turtles and how they are being protected.

The cooling outflow of the Riviera Beach Clean Energy Center attracts manatees which seek warm waters. In February 2015, construction began on the Florida Power and Light Manatee Education Center. It will include exhibits and meeting space, a boardwalk, and a manatee web cam.

Solar energy
FPL began its program Solar for Schools in 2013 and has installed solar arrays at more than 100 schools and non-profit educational centers across Florida. FPL started the SolarNow program, which installs community solar panels throughout Florida, in 2015. FPL customers can voluntarily contribute to the program.

FPL has pushed against net metering and sought to impose minimum monthly payments, facility charges, and grid access fees for rooftop solar energy users. FPL argued that the net metering policy in its present form unfairly required customers who do not own rooftop solar panels to subsidize the energy usage of those who do own them, whereas FPL's opponents argued that utilities like FPL were simply trying to curtail the expansion of rooftop solar panels to maintain their monopoly on electricity markets.

 Controversy 
According to records obtained by the Miami Herald and Floodlight, in 2021 FPL lobbied for a bill against net metering, the policy allowing rooftop solar panel users to offset the cost of solar panels by selling excess power back to utilities like FPL. Internal emails indicated that on October 18 an FPL lobbyist sent the text of the bill to Florida state senator Jennifer Bradley, who on October 20 received a $10,000 donation from FPL's parent company to her political committee, and a month later filed the bill in the senate. Bradley denied that the filing of the bill was due to the donation. 

According to the Florida Center for Investigative Reporting, several of the top utility companies in Florida, including FPL, have contributed over $12 million towards the election campaigns of state lawmakers since 2010. FPL contributed $2 million to promote 2016 Florida Amendment 1, which would have preserved the monopoly of utilities on rooftop solar in Florida.

In 2021, records obtained by the Orlando Sentinel tied top FPL executives to the political consultants responsible for the "ghost" candidate scandal, promoting spoiler candidates in key races in order to siphon off votes from Democrats. 

Documents reviewed by the Orlando Sentinel and the Miami Herald revealed that FPL executives used consultants and shell companies to funnel money to the local news website The Capitolist in order to get pro-utility articles and negative coverage about their political enemies published. An investigation by National Public Radio and Floodlight News found FPL did so through consulting firm Matrix LLC, which also supported positive coverage for itself and FPL-friendly governor Rick Scott in Florida Politics and the Sunshine State News''.

Matrix surveilled a Florida Times-Union columnist at home and on vacation in 2019 and 2020, after he wrote critically of FPL's attempts to influence the Jacksonville City Council to approve its acquitision of a local utility. Through a shell company, FPL offered one Jacksonville City Council member a $250,000 a year job promoting his pet issue of marijuana decriminalization on the condition he resign his council seat.

After the National Park Service raised concerns that it would emit toxic mercury into the lake and also harm the Everglades, the state Public Service Commission rejected the plan in 2007.

In August 2007, the St. Lucie nuclear plant reduced power output while a leak in a condensation pump was repaired.

In 2018 4.4 million FPL customers temporarily lost their power due to Hurricane Irma.

FPL proposed a severe winter weather plan that critics have argued would create unnecessary costs for consumers, considering the unlikelihood of a severe winter freeze in Florida.

Awards and recognition 
FPL won the prestigious Deming Award for quality improvement in 1989, becoming the first non-Japanese company to do so. As reported at the time by The South Florida Sun-Sentinel, FPL's quality improvement efforts were aimed at improving customer satisfaction.

In 2014, FPL:
 was recognized as the most trusted U.S. electric utility by Market Strategies International;  
 won the ReliabilityOne award for the south region and the Technology & Innovation award, both from the PA Consulting Group; and
 earned the national ServiceOne Award for outstanding customer service for the tenth consecutive year.

J.D. Power ranked FPL at the top position in customer satisfaction among energy utilities companies in 2016. Additionally, FPL Group and NextEra Energy were rated as the most admired company amongst gas and electric utilities by Fortune Magazine for eight consecutive years.

In 2020, FPL was ranked as the nation's most reliable electric power utility by PA Consulting, winning the ReliabilityOne award for the fifth time in six years. Additionally, FPL was acknowledged as the "most trusted U.S. electric utilities by Esculent for the seventh consecutive year" and "ranked No.1 in Fortune's 2020 list of World's Most Admired Companies".

See also 
 NextEra Energy Resources
 List of power stations in Florida
 Plant Scherer, a coal-fired plant in Georgia co-owned by FPL
 Plant Daniel, a coal-fired plant in Mississippi co-owned by FPL
 The Capitolist

References

External links 
 Gexa Energy website

Energy companies established in 1925
Electric power companies of the United States
Companies based in Palm Beach County, Florida
Energy companies of the United States
Nuclear power companies of the United States
NextEra Energy
1925 establishments in Florida